Mario "Lupo" Cantaluppi (born 11 April 1974) is a Swiss former professional footballer who played as a defender or midfielder.

Club career
Born in Schlieren, Switzerland, Mario Cantaluppi started his professional career with Grasshopper Club Zürich in 1990 and won the 1990–91 Nationaliga A in his debut season.

In 1993, he dropped down a division to sign for FC Basel who were playing in the Nationalliga B at the time. He signed the contract and joined the team under head-coach Claude Andrey. After playing in three test games, Cantaluppi played his domestic league debut for his new club in the home game in the St. Jakob Stadium on 28 July 1993 as Basel were defeated 1–2 by local rivals Old Boys. He scored his first goal for his club in the away game in La Blancherie on 14 August. It was the last goal of the match as Basel won 3–0 against SR Delémont.

During that season, his team mates were the likes of Swiss international goalkeeper Stefan Huber, defenders Massimo Ceccaroni, Marco Walker and Samir Tabakovic, the midfielders Reto Baumgartner, Martin Jeitziner, Admir Smajić and Ørjan Berg and the Swiss international strikers Dario Zuffi and Philippe Hertig. Together they won the promotion/relegation group and became Nationalliga B champions and thus won promotion to the top flight of Swiss football. This after six seasons in the second tier.

In the summer of 1996 he signed for Servette FC, but rejoined Basel three years later. He joined German Bundesliga club 1. FC Nürnberg in 2004 and played there for the next two seasons before returning to Switzerland to play for FC Luzern. In January 2008, he joined Belgium's K. Sint-Truidense V.V. and played there until summer 2009. In 2010, he was for about five months player-manager of SC Buochs.

International career
Cantaluppi made 23 appearance for the Switzerland national team. He helped Switzerland qualify for UEFA Euro 2004 but was left out of the final squad for the tournament after falling out with national coach Köbi Kuhn. Cantaluppi never played for Switzerland afterwards.

References

External links
 
 

Living people
1974 births
People from Schlieren, Switzerland
Sportspeople from the canton of Zürich
Swiss men's footballers
Association football midfielders
Association football defenders
Switzerland international footballers
Swiss Super League players
Swiss Challenge League players
Bundesliga players
Belgian Pro League players
Grasshopper Club Zürich players
FC Basel players
Servette FC players
1. FC Nürnberg players
FC Luzern players
Sint-Truidense V.V. players
TuS Koblenz players
Challenger Pro League players
Swiss expatriate footballers
Swiss expatriate sportspeople in Germany
Expatriate footballers in Germany
Swiss expatriate sportspeople in Belgium
Expatriate footballers in Belgium